Fixer Upper is an American reality television series about home design and renovation that aired on HGTV. The series stars Chip Gaines and Joanna Gaines, a married couple who own a home renovation and redecoration business in Waco, Texas. The show's pilot aired in May 2013, with the first full season beginning in April 2014. Season two began in January 2015; season three began in December 2015; and season four began in November 2016. The fifth and final season premiered on November 21, 2017.

Fixer Upper became popular soon after its debut, and the series is largely credited with the rise in popularity of "Farmhouse-chic" interior design in the late 2010s. In 2018, Zillow reported that homes with architectural features mentioned on the show, such as wainscoting, shiplap, clawfoot bathtubs, and barn doors, sold at an average of 30 percent above expected value. In addition, the show has generated an increase in tourism and economic development in Waco, Texas, where the show was taped.

In 2020, Discovery Inc. announced that Fixer Upper would be revived as a launch program for Magnolia Network—a new channel overseen by the Gaineses that replaced HGTV's sister channel DIY Network. The revival, Fixer Upper: Welcome Home, premiered in January 2021 as part of the Magnolia Network soft launch on Discovery+.

Premise

Fixer Upper is produced by High Noon Entertainment producers Scott Feeley and Jim Berger, producers of the cooking show Cake Boss. Prior to Fixer Upper, the Gaineses worked with clients on buying and remodeling homes. In total, the couple worked on over 100 homes. On the show, they start by showing a couple three potential homes for purchase in central Texas, each of which requires a varying amount of repair or renovation. Once the couple chooses their home, Joanna designs it and Chip is the lead contractor. The buyers typically have an overall budget of under $200,000 with at least $30,000 in renovations.

Episodes

Spin-off 
In March 2017, it was announced that Chip and Joanna Gaines would be getting a Fixer Upper spin-off series titled Fixer Upper: Behind the Design. The half-hour show showcases how Joanna comes up with the designs seen on Fixer Upper. The show premiered on April 10, 2018.

Other business
In 2016 Joanna and Chip Gaines started a quarterly lifestyle magazine Magnolia Journal, published by Meredith (later Dotdash Meredith).

As of November 1, 2017, Joanna teamed with Target Corporation to offer her Hearth & Hand with Magnolia collection. The collection, available in stores and online, features 300 pieces including bedding and lifestyle products. In February 2019, she created an exclusive collection for Anthropologie of "globally inspired" rugs and pillows.

On April 10, 2019, the Gaineses announced the launch of a "new media company." They will serve as chief creative officers and current HGTV president Allison Page will serve as president of the new joint venture, which will reportedly include a TV network and a streaming app.

In November 2019, the Gaineses opened a coffee shop, Magnolia Press, in Waco, Texas. The store was in addition to two others they already had, Magnolia Table and Silos Baking Co.

On April 26, 2020, at 5pm EDT, the soft launch of the cable network Magnolia Network kicked off with a four-hour presentation on the DIY Network: Magnolia Presents: A Look Back & A Look Ahead. DIY Network's rebranding as the Magnolia Network was originally going to be completed on October 4, 2020, but the date was pushed back due to the COVID-19 coronavirus pandemic. On August 4, 2020, it was announced that the network was scheduled to launch in 2021, with Fixer Upper resuming production before the launch of the new network on January 5, 2022.

Legacy
Fixer Upper is largely credited with the rise in popularity of "Farmhouse-chic" interior design in the late 2010s. In 2018, Zillow reported that homes with architectural features mentioned on the show, such as wainscoting, shiplap, clawfoot bathtubs, and barn doors, sold at an average of 30 percent above expected value. In addition, the show has generated an increase in tourism and economic development in Waco, Texas, where the show was filmed, extending the explosive growth of the Austin market area up the I-35 corridor of the communities towards the Dallas–Fort Worth metroplex.

Thanks to the show's popularity, the homes featured on the show have become desirable to either purchase or rent. At least six of the homes are available to rent through Airbnb or VRBO. Owners are renting them from $250 to $350 a night.

Selling the homes renovated by the Gaineses has also become a way for show participants to make a profit. The Bicycle House featured in Season 1, Episode 12 went up for sale in 2016 for $350,000 after being purchased for less than $50,000. It was also available for rent on VRBO for $250 a night. The Barndominium featured in Season 3, Episode 6 went up for sale in April 2017 for $1.2 million.

Legal issues 
On April 27, 2017, Chip Gaines was named in a fraud lawsuit filed by former business partners. The former partners alleged that the Gaineses persuaded them to sell their interest in Magnolia Realty to him for $2,500 each without disclosing plans that had been in the works to develop the Fixer Upper reality television show. In February 2020, a judge threw out the lawsuit.

In another matter, in June 2017, it was announced that they "settled with the United States Environmental Protection Agency over allegations that they violated rules for the safe handling of lead paint during home renovations." They paid $40,000 in fines and will comply with such regulations going forward, and "remain committed to raising awareness in our community and our industry."

References

External links 
Fixer Upper on HGTV
 

2010s American reality television series
2013 American television series debuts
2018 American television series endings
HGTV original programming
Television shows set in Waco, Texas
Home renovation television series
American television series revived after cancellation